The Coloured Persons Representative Council of the Republic of South Africa was a partially elected council with limited legislative powers, intended to represent coloured South Africans during the apartheid era. It was first elected in 1969, re-elected in 1975, and permanently dissolved in 1980. In 1984 the House of Representatives was created to represent coloured voters in the Tricameral Parliament.

Election results
30 September 1969:

19 March 1975:

Laws enacted
In the course of its existence the CPRC only passed a small number of laws:
 Law No. 1 of 1971: the Coloured Persons Rehabilitation Centres Law, 1971
 Law No. 1 of 1972: the Coloured Persons Rehabilitation Centres Amendment Law, 1972
 Law No. 1 of 1973: the Coloured Farmers Assistance Law, 1973
 Law No. 1 of 1974: the Coloured Persons Social Pensions Law, 1974
 Law No. 1 of 1977: the Coloured Persons Rehabilitation Centres Amendment Law, 1977
 Law No. 1 of 1979: the Rural Coloured Areas Law, 1979

Notes and references

Historical legislatures
Defunct organisations based in South Africa
Apartheid government
Organisations associated with apartheid
1969 establishments in South Africa
1980 disestablishments